Stuffed sorrel is a generic name for meals made of sorrel leaves stuffed with meat (lamb) and rice, or more rarely rice only. Meals are called as labada Sarma or evelik Dolma. 
It is mostly popular in Turkey, Azerbaijan, Syria but also known in the Balkans, especially in Bosnia and Herzegovina, where it may be served with mashed potatoes and yogurt.

See also
 List of stuffed dishes

References

Balkan cuisine
Serbian cuisine
Bosnia and Herzegovina cuisine
Stuffed vegetable dishes
Azerbaijani cuisine